Wilsthorpe is a village in the district of South Kesteven in the county of Lincolnshire, England. The population is included in the civil parish of Braceborough and Wilsthorpe.

Originally a Chapelry in Greatford parish, Wilsthorpe was created a civil parish in 1866 and lasted until 1931 when it was abolished to create the civil parish of Braceborough and Wilsthorpe.

Wilsthorpe is mentioned in Domesday Book of 1086 when it was listed as having 20 households,  of meadow,   of woodland, and two mills.

A possible Roman villa has been located as cropmarks to the south-east of the village, and King Street is a Roman road.

The church is a Grade II* listed building dedicated to Saint Faith. Built in 1715, it was restored and altered by James Fowler of Louth in 1869. In the sanctuary is a late-13th-century effigy of a knight in chain mail; perhaps a Wake family member. Hereward the Wake was an Anglo-Saxon who led resistance to the Norman Conquest, and was born in or near Bourne.

To the west of the village is the former railway station of Braceborough Spa Halt which was on the Essendine and Bourne Railway line. It opened in 1860 and closed in 1951. The old station house is now a private house.

Literature
Wilsthorpe appears as a real world location in Mr Humphreys and His Inheritance a short ghost story by M.R. James first published in More Ghost Stories in 1911

References

External links

Villages in Lincolnshire
South Kesteven District
Former civil parishes in Lincolnshire